Skiing in Tasmania takes place in the high country of the state of  Tasmania, Australia, during the Southern Hemisphere winter. Cross country skiing is possible within the Tasmanian Wilderness and two small downhill ski-fields have been developed at  Ben Lomond and Mount Mawson.

History and major locations

Skiing in Australia takes place in three States: New South Wales, Victoria and Tasmania; as well as in the Australian Capital Territory, during the Southern Hemisphere winter. Skiable terrain stretches through large areas of territory from June to October and a number of well serviced resorts have been developed, including: Thredbo, Perisher and Charlotte Pass in New South Wales; Mount Buller, Falls Creek and Mount Hotham in Victoria; as well as the small resorts of Ben Lomond and Mount Mawson in Tasmania.

The most southerly ski fields in Australia are located in Tasmania, a mountainous island off the southern coast of Eastern Australia. Much of the State is subject to at least occasional winter snows. Mount Ossa is the highest point on the island at  but Tasmania has eight mountains exceeding  and 28 above .

Downhill ski locations

Ben Lomond

Tasmania's premier alpine skiing operations are located at Ben Lomond,  from Launceston. Its season usually begins in mid-July and in peak season, its runs are served by six lifts.

The Northern Tasmanian Alpine Club formed in 1929 and pioneered trips to the mountain, and improved the access track. In 1932, a chalet was built at Carr Villa, and construction of a road from Upper Blessington to Carr Villa began soon after. It was finally completed in 1953.

In 1950 a Parliamentary Standing Committee recommended that Ben Lomond be developed as a ski resort. The Australian National Championships were held at the site in 1955. In 1963 the access road was extended to the top of the plateau via the steep and scenic "Jacobs Ladder". Subsequent developments have included new ski lifts, visitor facilities, a licensed inn and accommodation, sewerage system, and improved access. The Ben Lomond Skifield Management Authority was formed in 1995 to manage the Skifield Development Area. Today, a number of club lodges provide accommodation and the mountain has fine views which stretch to the ocean.

In 2010, the Department of Parks and Wildlife released a plan for the Ben Lomond ski area recommending snow making machines, the enhancement of snow play areas and the development  of a possible snow board park. Season 2011 saw the successful addition of a Super Wizard snowmaking machine at Ben Lomond, with an additional Super Wizard added for season 2012.

Mount Mawson

Mount Mawson is a small club field, located thirty minutes walk from its carpark. Mawson has three lifts: two intermediate rope tows and a third steep incline rope tow accessing steep terrain. A small amount of club accommodation is available and there are some self-catering huts in the National Park.

Cross country and back country ski locations

When conditions allow, Tasmania's rugged conditions offers cross country skiers some scenic terrain. One of Australia's most scenic alpine locations is located in Tasmania at Cradle Mountain, where cross country skiing can be possible, when conditions allow. Cradle Mountain is part of the Tasmanian Wilderness World Heritage Area, inscribed by UNESCO in 1982. Tasmania has 28 mountains above 1,220m and much of the island is subject to at least occasional winter snow.

The Australian High Country is populated by unique flora and fauna including wombats, wallabies, echidnas, and the Snow Gums. The alpine regions are subject to environmental protection, which has limited the scope of commercial development of skiiable terrain, however Australia has extensive cross country skiing terrain.

Other cross country and back country skiing locations can be found in the Cradle Mountain-Lake St Clair National Park, the Ben Lomond National Park, the Mount Field National Park, and the Walls of Jerusalem National Park.

Gallery

List of highest mountains of Tasmania
Skiing in Australia
Skiing in New South Wales
Skiing in Victoria, Australia
Skiing in the Australian Capital Territory
List of ski areas and resorts in Australia
Winter sport in Australia

Footnotes & References

External links
ski.com.au
Australian Alps National Parks
Bureau of Meteorology Climate Education
Australia at the Winter Olympics
Ski & Snowboard Australia
Cross Country Skiing Australia
Tasmanian Wilderness World Heritage Area
50 Reasons to Love Australian Snow, Sydney Morning Herald, 6 June 2009.
 78 Years Skiing Tasmania
Australian Ski Lift Directory. Details of all of the 400 ski lifts that have been built in Australia.

 
Tasmania